Jet is a fictional superhero published by DC Comics. She first appeared in Millennium #2 (January 1988) and was created by Steve Engelhart and Joe Staton.

Fictional character biography
The creators of the Green Lantern Corps, the Guardians of the Universe, had planned to create their successors, a race of new Guardians. The Guardians foresaw that their successors were destined to originate on the planet Earth, so they channeled their vast powers into the "Millennium Project", gathering ten individuals together, teaching them about the nature of the cosmos and endowing them with immortality and metahuman powers. One of these was Celia Windward, a young Jamaican woman living in Great Britain, to whom the Guardians gave the power to control electromagnetic energies. She became Jet, and joined the other heroes the Guardians had made in the team named (appropriately enough) the New Guardians. Jet fought many foes, but contracted HIV fighting the "Hemo-Goblin". As her symptoms worsened into AIDS, she used her last bit of energy to repel an alien invasion, an act which claimed her life.

One Year Later, Jet is apparently alive, and is leader of the Global Guardians. She has publicly renounced the actions of the Green Lanterns, saying that they violated the rules of foreign countries, and undermined her team's attempt to prove that metahumans can act without governmental restrictions. She has been assembling more non-American heroes, even forcing the new Crimson Fox to join her team.

As seen in the pages of Green Lantern, Jet and her team were under the psychic thrall of two Faceless Hunters.

Powers and abilities
Jet has the ability to generate various forms of electromagnetic waves, such as microwaves, to use for a variety of uses. 

She can fire blasts of heat and force, generate electromagnetic pulses, move and manipulate metal with magnetic fields, fire blasts of electricity, and see in other frequencies of the spectrum besides visible light (such as ultraviolet and infrared). 

She can fly by "riding" the natural electromagnetic field of the Earth (via magnetic levitation). 

When she uses her powers, her hair resembles green flames, although she doesn't have any fire-related abilities.

In other media
Celia Windward appears in the third season of Young Justice, voiced by Lauren Tom.

References

External links
World of Black Heroes: Jet Biography

Characters created by Steve Englehart
Comics characters introduced in 1988
DC Comics female superheroes
DC Comics metahumans
DC Comics superheroes
Fictional characters with HIV/AIDS
HIV/AIDS in comics
Fictional Jamaican people
Fictional English people